These are the list of personnel changes in the NBA from the 1964–65 NBA season.

Events

August 8, 1964
 The Baltimore Bullets hired Buddy Jeannette as head coach.

August 26, 1964
 The Cincinnati Royals sold Steve Courtin to the Baltimore Bullets.
 The St. Louis Hawks sold Jerry Grote to the Philadelphia 76ers.

September 24, 1964
 The Detroit Pistons waived Jim Davis.

October 17, 1964
 The New York Knicks sold Al Butler to the Baltimore Bullets.

October 18, 1964
 The New York Knicks traded Bill McGill to the St. Louis Hawks for a 1965 2nd round draft pick (Hal Blevins was later selected).

November 2, 1964
 The Boston Celtics signed Gerry Ward as a free agent.

November 11, 1964
 The Baltimore Bullets signed Gary Hill as a free agent.

December 27, 1964
 The St. Louis Hawks fired Harry Gallatin as head coach.
 The St. Louis Hawks appointed Richie Guerin as head coach.

January 3, 1965
 The New York Knicks reassigned Head Coach Eddie Donovan.
 The New York Knicks hired Harry Gallatin as head coach.

January 15, 1965
 The San Francisco Warriors traded Wilt Chamberlain to the Philadelphia 76ers for Connie Dierking, Paul Neumann, Lee Shaffer and cash.

January 22, 1965
 The Philadelphia 76ers signed Steve Courtin as a free agent.

January 28, 1965
 The Los Angeles Lakers signed Bill McGill as a free agent.

February 2, 1965
 The San Francisco Warriors signed John Rudometkin as a free agent.

February 3, 1965
 The San Francisco Warriors signed John Rudometkin as a free agent.

February 8, 1965
 The San Francisco Warriors signed Cotton Nash as a free agent.

February 14, 1965
 The New York Knicks signed Barry Kramer as a free agent.

May 13, 1965
 The Baltimore Bullets reassigned Head Coach Buddy Jeannette.
 The Baltimore Bullets appointed Buddy Jeannette as general manager.
 The Baltimore Bullets hired Paul Seymour as head coach.

References
NBA Transactions at NBA.com
1964-65 NBA Transactions| Basketball-Reference.com

Transactions
NBA transactions